The Radio Nurse was the first electronic baby monitor. Manufactured by the Zenith Radio Corporation, it went on sale in 1938. The product was developed by Zenith executive Eugene F. McDonald, and designed by Japanese-American sculptor and product designer Isamu Noguchi. Although the product was manufactured for only a few years, it has been acclaimed for its design. It is still in demand as a collectible and is in many museum collections.

Design, function and marketing 

The product commonly called the Radio Nurse consisted of two components, the Radio Nurse Receiver and the Guardian Ear Transmitter. Noguchi designed the Radio Nurse Receiver, which was made from a dark colored Bakelite in a streamlined modernist form. The Guardian Ear Transmitter was a more utilitarian design, and was made from enameled metal.

The Radio Nurse was Noguchi's first major design commission and he called it "my only strictly industrial design"
The product encountered technical problems because it shared a radio frequency with other new consumer technologies including car radios and garage door openers."

Although the Radio Nurse has commonly been described as a baby monitor, an early Zenith advertisement mentioned invalids as well as infants, and featured an illustration of an elderly woman as well as a baby. This ad appeared in Hygeia, a popular magazine published by the American Medical Association.

Critical reception 

In 1938, the Radio Nurse was included in an exhibition at the Whitney Museum of American Art. In its review of the show, Time said, "Most exotic: Isamu Noguchi's Radio Nurse, a grilled bakelite face—prettier as a radio than as a nurse."

Design historians Charlotte and Peter Fiell wrote that the Radio Nurse "displayed a remarkably refined synthesis of form and function". The Encyclopedia of Interior Design said that the Radio Nurse has a "strangely comforting watchful quality". Smithsonian magazine wrote that "It sits like a dark, faceless plastic mask, more like a prototype for a Star Wars film." On Antiques Roadshow, appraiser Gary Piattoni said, "What's significant about this piece is the design. It's an excellent example of modern design by a very famous Japanese-American designer called Isamu Noguchi."

Reflecting on the attention he received, Noguchi wrote in his autobiography, "By a curious switch, I thought of commercial art as less contaminated than one that appealed to vanity."

Museum collections 

The Radio Nurse is included in the collections of many American museums, such as the Metropolitan Museum of Art, the Henry Ford Museum, the Museum of Modern Art, the Noguchi Museum, the Cooper Hewitt, the Oakland Museum of California, the Yale University Art Gallery, and the Los Angeles County Museum of Art. It is also part of the collections of the Montreal Museum of Fine Arts, the Victoria and Albert Museum in London and the M+ museum under construction in Hong Kong.

References

External links 
 Cooper Hewitt – A Modernist Mother's Helper

Babycare
Consumer electronics
Monitor
Safety equipment